Glyphodes lacustralis is a moth in the family Crambidae. It was described by Frederic Moore in 1867. It is found in India (Meghalaya, Bengal).

References

Moths described in 1867
Glyphodes